Marcelo Ríos was the defending champion but did not compete that year.

Juan Carlos Ferrero won in the final 6–3, 1–6, 7–6 (7–4) against Carlos Moyá.

Seeds
A champion seed is indicated in bold text while text in italics indicates the round in which that seed was eliminated.

  Marat Safin (second round)
  Juan Carlos Ferrero (champion)
  Carlos Moyá (final)
  Àlex Corretja (second round)
  Juan Ignacio Chela (quarterfinals)
 n/a
  Nicolás Lapentti (second round)
  Paradorn Srichaphan (first round)

Draw

References
 2002 Hong Kong Open Draw

Hong Kong Open (tennis)
Singles